The 1908 Summer Olympics (officially the Games of the IV Olympiad and also known as London 1908) were an international multi-sport event held in London, England, United Kingdom, from 27 April to 31 October 1908. The 1908 Games were originally scheduled to be held in Rome, but were relocated on financial grounds following the violent eruption of Mount Vesuvius in 1906, which claimed over 100 lives; Rome eventually hosted the Games in 1960. 

These were the fourth chronological modern Summer Olympics in keeping with the now-accepted four-year cycle as opposed to the alternate four-year cycle of the proposed Intercalated Games. The IOC president for these Games was Baron Pierre de Coubertin. Lasting a total of 187 days (or six months and four days), these Games were the longest in modern Olympics history. The duration of the Summer Games was 16 days in 1912, ranged between 15 and 18 days from 1928 to 1992, and was fixed at 17 days from 1996.

Background 
There were four bids for the 1908 Summer Olympics. Rome was selected ahead of London, Berlin and Milan. The selection was made at the 6th IOC Session in London in 1904.

Italian authorities were preparing to stage the games when Mount Vesuvius erupted on 7 April 1906, devastating the city of Naples. Funds were diverted to the reconstruction of Naples, so a new host country was required. London was selected for the first time to hold the Games which were held at White City alongside the Franco-British Exhibition, at the time the more noteworthy event.

The White City Stadium, built in short time for the Games, held 68,000 people, with full crowds turning up to watch the events. The stadium track was three laps to the mile (536.448 metres), as the current standard of 400 metres did not exist until 1962, with a pool (for swimming and diving events) and platforms (for wrestling and gymnastics) in the center field.

The distance from the start of the marathon to the finish at the stadium was established at these Games: the original distance of 25 miles was changed to 26 miles so the marathon could start at Windsor Castle and then changed again at the request of Princess Mary so the start would be beneath the windows of the Royal Nursery. To ensure that the race would finish in front of the King, the finish line was moved by British officials who "felt compelled to restore the importance of the monarchy." As a result of these changes, the marathon covered a distance of 26 miles 385 yards (42.195 km), which became the standard length starting with the 1924 Summer Olympics.

The Games 
There were controversies at the games. On the opening day, following the practice introduced at the Intercalated Games of 1906, teams paraded behind national flags. However, the arrangement caused complications:
 Since Finland was part of the Russian Empire, members of the Finnish team were expected to march under the Russian rather than Finnish flag, so many chose to march without a flag at all.
 The Swedish flag had not been displayed above the stadium, so the members of the Swedish team decided not to take part in the ceremony.

American refusal of flag dipping 
The United States' flag bearer, Ralph Rose, refused to dip the flag to King-Emperor Edward VII in the royal box. His fellow athlete Martin Sheridan allegedly declared that "this flag dips to no earthly King." The quote is held as an example of Irish and American defiance of the British monarchy, though its historicity is disputed.

Events 
The 1908 Olympics also prompted establishment of standard rules for sports, and selection of judges from different countries rather than just the host. One reason was the 400 metre race, in which a US runner, John Carpenter, was accused by the British officials of interfering with a British runner. Part of the problem was the different definition of interference under British and international rules (the events were held under British rules by the decision of the Organising Committee). The officials decided to disqualify Carpenter and ordered a second final race without him. British Halswelle was to face the other two finalists. These athletes, William Robbins and John Taylor, were both Americans and decided not to participate in the repeat of the final to protest against the judges' decision. Halswelle was thus the only medallist in the 400 metres.

The most famous incident of the games came at the end of the marathon. Dorando Pietri, Italy, began his race at a rather slow pace, but in the second half of the course began a powerful surge moving him into second position by the  mark, 4 minutes behind South African Charles Hefferon. When he knew that Hefferon was in crisis, Pietri further increased his pace, overtaking him at the  mark.

The effort took its toll and with only two kilometres to go, Pietri began to feel the effects of extreme fatigue and dehydration. When he entered the stadium, he took the wrong path and when umpires redirected him, he fell down for the first time. He got up with their help, in front of 75,000 spectators.

He fell four more times, and each time the umpires helped him up. In the end, though totally exhausted, he managed to finish the race in first place. Of his total time of 2h 54min 46s, ten minutes were needed for that last 340 metres. Second was American Johnny Hayes. The American team immediately lodged a complaint against the help Pietri received from the umpires. The complaint was accepted and Pietri was disqualified and removed from the final standings of the race. Since he had not been responsible for his disqualification, Queen Alexandra awarded him a gilded silver cup the next day.

These Games were the first to include winter events, as had originally been proposed for the Games. There were four figure skating events, although held on 28 and 29 October, months after most of the other events.

Oscar Swahn from Sweden, who won the gold medal for running deer shooting, became the oldest Olympic champion of all time, and set another age record by being 72 years and 279 days old during his triumph at the 1920 Summer Olympics in Antwerp, Belgium. One of the more unusual shooting events in 1908 was Olympic dueling. The discipline, which was an associate event (i.e. not official), was performed by facing opponents wearing protective clothing and masks and firing wax bullets.

American John Taylor was a member of the winning medley relay team, making him the first African-American athlete to win an Olympic gold medal. Times for the winning team were United States (3:29.4): William Hamilton-200 metres (22.0), Nathaniel Cartmell-200 metres (22.2), John Taylor-400 metres (49.8), and Melvin Sheppard-800 metres (1:55.4).

Less than five months after returning from the Olympic Games in London, Taylor died of typhoid fever on 2 December 1908 at the age of 26.

The budget of the organising committee showed a cost of £15,000; over one-third was labelled "entertainment expense". Donations were the major source of revenue; only 28% of income derived from ticket sales. Total receipts of £21,378 resulted in organisers claiming a profit. Construction of the White City Stadium, which cost the government about £60,000, was not counted.

Sports 
22 sports, representing 110 events in 24 sporting disciplines, were contested. A golf tournament had also been planned but it was cancelled a few days before it was scheduled to start. Swimming, diving and water polo are considered three disciplines of the same sport, aquatics. At the time, tug-of-war was part of athletics and the two different football codes (association and rugby (union)) were listed together. The International Olympic Committee now considers tug-of-war a separate sport, as well as referring to association football as simply "football" and to rugby union as "rugby". In one of seven cycling events (cycling sprint) no medals were awarded. The sailing program was open for a total of five sailing classes, but actually only four sailing events were contested. The number of events in each discipline is noted in parentheses.

Venues 

Thirteen sports venues were used for the 1908 Summer Olympics. The first winter sports took place at Prince's Skating Club in Knightsbridge. White City Stadium served as a precursor to modern stadiums. The figure skating events were not held at the next Olympics in Stockholm, but returned for the 1920 Games in Antwerp, heralding the first Winter Olympics that took place in Chamonix in 1924. White City was the main venue for the 1934 British Empire Games (known as the Commonwealth Games since 1978) and, before its demolition in 1985, also served as a venue for the 1966 FIFA World Cup. The All England Lawn Tennis Club continues to host the Wimbledon championships and is the only venue of the 1908 Games that was used for the 2012 Summer Olympics.

Bisley and Henley served as venues in the 1948 Games when the Olympics returned to London forty years later.

Participating nations 

The 1908 Games featured athletes representing 22 National Olympic Committees. Finland, Turkey and New Zealand (as part of the team from Australasia) made their first appearance at the Olympic Games. The fact that the United Kingdom competed as a single team was upsetting to some Irish competitors, who felt that Ireland should compete on its own, despite being part of the UK at the time. Fearing an Irish boycott, the authorities changed the name of the team to Great Britain/Ireland, and in two sports, field hockey and polo, Ireland participated as a separate country, winning silver medals in both. Irish athletes in the United States were not affected by this controversy, and many Irish immigrants to the United States competed for the U.S. Olympic team as members of the Irish American Athletic Club. Members of the Irish American Athletic Club won ten of the U.S. Olympic team's total 23 gold medals, or as many as the nations of France, Germany and Italy combined.

Number of athletes by National Olympic Committees

Medal count 

These are the top ten nations that won 
medals at the 1908 Games.

See also 

History of Shepherd's Bush

References

External links 

 
Parliament & the 1908 Olympics - UK Parliament Living Heritage
 
 
 
 Video footage of the 1908 Summer Olympics
 White City Stadium/BBC radio
 The London Olympics by Russell James

 
History of the London Borough of Hammersmith and Fulham
Summer Olympics in London
Summer Olympics by year
Olympic Games in the United Kingdom
Summer Olympics
Olympic Games
Olympic Games